Lester Young with the Oscar Peterson Trio is a 1954 studio album by Lester Young, accompanied by Oscar Peterson's working trio of the time (featuring Ray Brown and Barney Kessel), plus drummer J. C. Heard. The music on this album was originally released as three separate albums: Lester Young with the Oscar Peterson Trio #1 and Lester Young with the Oscar Peterson Trio #2, both released in June 1954 (MGN 5 & 6), and The President (August 1954, MGN 1005). It was collated for this 1997 reissue by Verve Records.

Track listing 
 "Ad Lib Blues" (Oscar Peterson, Lester Young) – 5:54
 "I Can't Get Started" (Vernon Duke, Ira Gershwin) – 3:41
 "Just You, Just Me" (Jesse Greer, Raymond Klages) – 7:40
 "Almost Like Being in Love" (Alan Jay Lerner, Frederick Loewe) – 3:34
 "Tea for Two" (Irving Caesar, Vincent Youmans) – 7:45
 "There Will Never Be Another You" (Mack Gordon, Harry Warren) – 3:28
 "(Back Home Again In) Indiana" (James F. Hanley, Ballard MacDonald) – 7:04
 "On the Sunny Side of the Street" (Dorothy Fields, Jimmy McHugh) – 3:27
 "Stardust" (Hoagy Carmichael, Mitchell Parish) – 3:35
 "(I'm) Confessin' (That I Love You)" (Doc Daugherty, Al J. Neiburg, Ellis Reynolds) – 3:41
 "I Can't Give You Anything But Love" (Fields, McHugh) – 3:22
 "These Foolish Things" (Harry Link, Holt Marvell, Jack Strachey) – 3:27
 "(It Takes) Two to Tango": Rehearsal, False Start and Chatter (Al Hoffman, Dick Manning) – 6:06 Bonus track on CD reissue
 "I Can't Get Started" – 0:53 Bonus track on CD reissue

Personnel

Performance 
 Lester Young – tenor saxophone, vocals on Two to Tango
 Oscar Peterson – piano
 Barney Kessel – guitar
 Ray Brown – double bass
 J. C. Heard - drums

Production 
 Nat Hentoff - liner notes
 Norman Granz - producer

References 

1954 compilation albums
Lester Young albums
Oscar Peterson compilation albums
Albums produced by Norman Granz
Albums with cover art by David Stone Martin
Verve Records compilation albums
Norgran Records compilation albums